Stephensville is a small unincorporated community located entirely within the town of Ellington in west-central Outagamie County, Wisconsin, United States. Stephensville is classified as a Class U6 Community by the USGS, being a populated place located wholly or substantially outside the boundaries of any incorporated place or CDP with a recognized authoritative common name.

Stephensville is located 4 miles northeast of Hortonville, 7 miles northwest of Greenville, 5 miles south of Shiocton and 15 miles northwest of Appleton.

Bear Creek passes through the community just east of its mouth with the Wolf River.

Mail is delivered by the Hortonville post office.

Geography
Stephensville is located at  (44.3733170, -88.5842708), and the elevation is 804 feet (245 m).

Education
Stephensville is located within the Hortonville Area School District.

Transportation
Stephensville is located on Wisconsin Highway 76. Outagamie County Highways S & MM also enter the community. Because of its scenic nature, Outagamie County Highway MM has been classified as a Rustic Road (Route 61) from Stephensville to Hortonville.

Worship

Saint Patrick Catholic Church and Saint Paul Evangelical Lutheran Church are located within the community.

Images

References

External links
Hortonville Area School District

Unincorporated communities in Outagamie County, Wisconsin
Unincorporated communities in Wisconsin